The 1976–77 Nationalliga A season was the 39th season of the Nationalliga A, the top level of ice hockey in Switzerland. Eight teams participated in the league, and SC Bern won the championship.

Standings

External links
Championnat de Suisse 1976/77

Swiss
National League (ice hockey) seasons
1976–77 in Swiss ice hockey